Marcus Umbrius Primus (fl. Late 2nd century to early 3rd century AD) was a Roman senator who was appointed suffect consul around AD 185.

Biography
Umbrius Primus was a member of the gens Umbrii Primi which hailed from Compsa (known today as Conza della Campania). After serving as governor of Lycia et Pamphylia, he was appointed Suffect consul around AD 185 or 186. Around AD 201 or 202 he was the Proconsular governor of Africa Proconsularis.

Umbrius Primus is believed to have been the adoptive father of Marcus Nummius Umbrius Primus Senecio Albinus, who served as consul in AD 206, although it has been speculated that Umbrius Primus may in fact have been his biological father.

Sources
 Mennen, Inge, Power and Status in the Roman Empire, AD 193-284 (2011)

References

2nd-century Romans
3rd-century Romans
Roman governors of Lycia et Pamphylia 
Suffect consuls of Imperial Rome
Roman governors of Africa
Year of birth unknown
Year of death unknown